Cardamyle or Kardamyle was a town of ancient Messenia. It is mentioned by Homer in the Iliad as one of the seven places offered by Agamemnon to Achilles. It was situated on a strong rocky height at the distance of seven stadia from the sea, and sixty from Leuctra. It is called a Laconian town by Herodotus, since the whole of Messenia was included in the territories of Laconia at the time of the historian. It again became a town of Messenia on the restoration of the independence of the latter; but it was finally separated from Messenia by Augustus, and annexed to Laconia. Pausanias mentions at Cardamyle sanctuaries of Athena and of Apollo Carneius; and in the neighbourhood of the town a temenos of the Nereids.

References

Populated places in ancient Laconia
Populated places in ancient Messenia
Former populated places in Greece
Ancient Greek archaeological sites in Greece
Locations in the Iliad